Jerzy Semkow (12 October 1928 – 23 December 2014) was a Polish conductor.

Semkow was born in Radomsko, Poland, later took French citizenship and resided in Paris.  He studied in Cracow and Leningrad. His conducting mentors included Erich Kleiber, Bruno Walter, and Tullio Serafin.  He was an assistant conductor with Yevgeny Mravinsky with the Leningrad Philharmonic Orchestra.

Semkow held posts as artistic director of the National Opera in Warsaw (1958-1959), principal conductor of the National Opera in Warsaw (1959–62), principal conductor of the Royal Danish Opera and the Royal Danish Orchestra in Copenhagen (1966–76), as well as music director of the Orchestra of Radio-Televisione Italiana (RAI) in Rome.  In the US, Semkow served as music director of the St. Louis Symphony Orchestra (1975–79), and as music advisor and principal conductor of the Rochester Philharmonic (1985–89).  He was a regular guest conductor of the National Philharmonic in Warsaw and of the Detroit Symphony Orchestra over a 40-year period, including guest appearances over 24 consecutive seasons from 1986 to 2009.

Semkow lectured on music at the University of Colorado and conducted master classes at Yale University and New York's Manhattan School of Music.  He recorded commercially with the St. Louis Symphony Orchestra for the Vox/Turnabout label.

Awarded the French order Arts et Lettres (2000) and received honorary doctorate from the Music Academy in Warsaw (2005) and from Music Academy in Łódź (2013).

Semkow died near Lausanne, Switzerland on 23 December 2014, aged 86. His biography was published the same year, authored by Małgorzata Komorowska.

References

External links
 Jerzy Semkow at the St. Louis Symphony Orchestra
 Polish Radio, '"Był księciem batuty". Jerzy Semkow nie żyje'  24 December 2014 (article in Polish)
 Encyclopedia.com entry on Semkow

1928 births
2014 deaths
Naturalized citizens of France
Polish emigrants to France
Polish conductors (music)
Male conductors (music)
French male conductors (music)
20th-century French conductors (music)
21st-century French conductors (music)
People from Radomsko
20th-century French male musicians
21st-century French male musicians